Sherlock is a British television series that presents a contemporary update of Sir Arthur Conan Doyle's Sherlock Holmes detective stories. It was created by Steven Moffat and Mark Gatiss, and stars Benedict Cumberbatch as Sherlock Holmes and Martin Freeman as Doctor John Watson. Sherlock has been nominated for a variety of different awards. It has been nominated for 42 awards and has won 24 awards currently.

BAFTA

Although the first series won Best Drama Series, amended rules meant that the second series was ineligible for the category in 2012.

|-
| rowspan="4" | 2011
| rowspan="2" | Sherlock series 1
| Best Drama Series
| 
|-
| YouTube Audience Award
| 
|-
| Benedict Cumberbatch, for Sherlock
| Best Actor
| 
|-
| Martin Freeman, for John Watson
| Best Supporting Actor
| 
|-
| rowspan="4" |2012
| Sherlock series 2
| YouTube Audience Award
| 
|-
| Benedict Cumberbatch, for Sherlock
| Best Actor
| 
|-
| Martin Freeman, for John Watson
| Best Supporting Actor
| 
|-
| Andrew Scott, for Jim Moriarty
| Best Supporting Actor
| 
|-
| rowspan="2" |2015
| Sherlock series 3
| Radio Times Audience Award
| 
|-
| Benedict Cumberbatch, for Sherlock
| Best Actor
| 
|-
|}

BAFTA Cymru

|-
| 2012
| Sherlock
| Television drama
| 
|-
| 2011
| Euros Lyn
|  Director: Fiction
| 
|-
| 2012
| Steve Lawes
| Director of Photography: Fiction
| 
|-
| 2012
| Arwel Wyn Jones
| Production Design
| 
|-
| 2012
| Claire Pritchard-Jones
| Make Up & Hair
| 
|-
|}

British Academy Television Craft Awards

|-
| 2011
| Charlie Phillips
| Editing: Fiction
| 
|-
| 2012
| Steven Moffat, for "A Scandal in Belgravia"
| Writing
| 
|-
| 2012
| Charlie Phillips, for "A Scandal in Belgravia"
| Editing: Fiction
| 
|-
| 2012
|John Mooney, Jeremy Child, Howard Bargroff, Doug Sinclair, for "A Scandal in Belgravia"
| Sound: Fiction
| 
|}

Cinema Audio Society Awards

Critics' Choice Television Award
The Critics' Choice Television Award is organised by the Broadcast Television Journalists Association (BJTA). It is intended to act as a forerunner to the more established Emmy awards.

|-
| rowspan=3|2012
| Sherlock
| Best Movie/Miniseries
| 
|-
| Benedict Cumberbatch
| Best Movie/Miniseries Actor
| 
|-
| Lara Pulver
| Best Movie/Miniseries Actress
| 
|-
| rowspan=4| 2014
| Sherlock
| Best Movie/Miniseries
|
|-
| Benedict Cumberbatch
| Best Actor in a Movie/Miniseries
|
|-
|Martin Freeman
| Best Supporting Actor in a Movie/Miniseries
| 
|-
|Amanda Abbington
|Best Supporting Actress in a Movie/Miniseries
|
|-
|}

Edinburgh International Television Festival

|-
| 2011
| Sherlock series 1
| Arqiva award for the best terrestrial show
| 
|-
| rowspan=2|2012
| Sherlock series 2
| Arqiva award for the best terrestrial show
| 
|-
| Sherlock
| Network And Ones To Watch Programme Choice
|
|-
|}

Emmys

Golden Globe Award

Peabody Award

|-
| 2011
| A Study in Pink
|Peabody Award
| 
|}

Producers Guild of America Award

South Bank Sky Arts Awards

The South Bank Sky Arts Awards are associated with the long-running documentary series The South Bank Show, presented by Melvyn Bragg. The awards were renamed to reflect a move from ITV to Sky Arts.

|-
| 2012
| Sherlock
| Best TV Drama
| 
|}

Television Critics Association Awards

|-
| 2011
| Sherlock
| Outstanding Achievement in Movies, Miniseries and Specials
| 
|-
| 2012
| Sherlock
| Outstanding Achievement in Movies, Miniseries and Specials
| 
|-
|}

References

External links 
 Sherlock Awards and Nominations on IMDb

Sherlock
Sherlock (TV series)
Awards and nominations received by Sherlock
Awards and nominations received by Sherlock